Daniel Joseph Minnehan (November 28, 1865 – August 8, 1929) was a professional baseball player. He played part of one season in Major League Baseball in 1895 as a third baseman for the Louisville Colonels. He played minor league baseball for twelve seasons, from 1888 until 1899.

Minnehan was playing for the Syracuse Stars when he was acquired by the Colonels late in the 1895 season to fill in for Jimmy Collins. Minnehan, a 30-year-old rookie, played seven of the last eight games at third base, batting .382, scoring six runs and driving in six. He never played in the Major Leagues again.

External links

Major League Baseball third basemen
Louisville Colonels players
Jackson Jaxons players
Minneapolis Millers (baseball) players
Oconto (minor league baseball) players
Seattle Hustlers players
Butte (minor league baseball) players
Mobile Blackbirds players
Montgomery Colts players
Albany Senators players
Syracuse Stars (minor league baseball) players
Reading Actives players
Wilkes-Barre Coal Barons players
Paterson Weavers players
Schenectady Electricians players
Baseball players from New York (state)
Sportspeople from Troy, New York
1865 births
1929 deaths
19th-century baseball players